Guankou Subdistrict is a subdistrict in Dujiangyan City, Sichuan, China. , it administers the following nine residential communities: 
 Nanqiao Community (
 Liuhe Community (
 Pingyi Community (
 Puyang Road Community (
 Jianxing Community (
 Taiping Community (
 Fulong Community (
 Xichuan Community (
 Lingyan Community (

See also 
 List of township-level divisions of Sichuan

References 

Township-level divisions of Sichuan
Dujiangyan City